Spare Parts is the second studio album by the English rock band Status Quo, and their final one in the psychedelic vein. It is the first in which the group's roadie Bob Young wrote and co-wrote songs for and with the band. Released in September 1969, it was not a commercial success.

The album covers a song written by Carole King and Gerry Goffin, "You're Just What I Was Looking for Today".
Only one song was slated for a single release. This was  the Anthony King written song "Are You Growing Tired of My Love", backed with the Alan Lancaster composition "So Ends Another Life". Released in April 1969 it reached no. 46 in UK singles charts.

Following the album's disappointing reception, the band released a non-album single – the Everly Brothers' "The Price of Love", also released in September 1969, with the Francis Rossi and Rick Parfitt composition "Little Miss Nothing" as the B-side.

Track listing
Side one
"Face Without a Soul" (Francis Rossi, Rick Parfitt) - 3:08
"You're Just What I Was Looking for Today" (Gerry Goffin, Carole King) - 3:50
"Are You Growing Tired of My Love" (Anthony King) - 3:37
"Antique Angelique" (Alan Lancaster, Bob Young) - 3:22
"So Ends Another Life" (Lancaster) - 3:12
"Poor Old Man" (Rossi, Parfitt) - 3:36
Side two
"Mr. Mind Detector" (A. King) - 4:01
"The Clown" (Lancaster, Young, Paul Nixon) - 3:22
"Velvet Curtains" (A. King) - 2:56
"Little Miss Nothing" (Rossi, Parfitt) - 2:59
"When I Awake" (Lancaster, Young) - 3:49
"Nothing at All" (Lancaster, Roy Lynes, Young) - 3:52

1998 Remaster bonus tracks
"The Price of Love" (Don Everly, Phil Everly) - 3:41
"Josie" (Dion Francis DiMucci, Tony Fasce) - 3:37
"Do You Live in Fire" (Lancaster) - 2:16
"Hey Little Woman" (Previously unreleased version) (Lancaster) - 3:56
"Are You Growing Tired of My Love" (A. King) - 3:39

2003 reissue bonus tracks
"Josie" (DiMucci, Fasce) - 3:37
"Do You Live in Fire" (Lancaster) - 2:16
"Nothing At All" (demo) (Lancaster, Young, Lynes)
"The Price of Love" (D. Everly, P. Everly) - 3:41

2009 Deluxe Edition Bonus Tracks
"Josie" (DiMucci, Fasce) - 3:37
"Do You Live in Fire" (Lancaster) - 2:16
"Face Without a Soul" [Mono Version] (Parfitt, Rossi) - 3:10
"You're Just What I Was Looking for Today" [Mono Version] (Goffin, King) - 3:51
"Are You Growing Tired of My Love" [Mono Version] (A. King) - 3:40
"Antique Angelique" [Mono Version] (Lancaster, Young) - 3:25
"So Ends Another Life" [Mono Version] (Lancaster) - 3:13
"Poor Old Man" [Mono Version] (Parfitt, Rossi) - 3:41
"Mr. Mind Detector" [Mono Version] (A. King) - 4:03
"The Clown" [Mono Version] (Lancaster, Young, Nixon) - 3:25
"Velvet Curtains" [Mono Version] (A. King) - 3:01
"Little Miss Nothing" [Mono Version] (Parfitt, Rossi) - 3:03
"When I Awake" [Mono Version] (Lancaster, Young) - 3:54
"Nothing at All" [Mono Version] (Lancaster, Lynes, Young) - 3:59
"Nothing at All" [Demo Version] (Lancaster, Lynes, Young) - 2:23
"The Price of Love" (D. Everly, P. Everley) - 3:42

Personnel
Status Quo
 Francis Rossi – guitar, vocals
 Rick Parfitt – guitar, vocals
 Alan Lancaster – bass, vocals
 John Coghlan – drums
 Roy Lynes – organ, vocals

References

Status Quo (band) albums
1969 albums
Pye Records albums
Psychedelic rock albums by English artists